Seymour Direct  is a UK payment processing company. It provides online payment solutions as a developer of Sagepay

as well as point of sale credit card processing solutions for small to medium businesses. They partner with 3 of the UK’s most well known acquiring banks  Elavon, First Data and Worldpay to help give upcoming businesses the same opportunities that big brand chain stores have with payment facilities.

When a merchant orders a PDQ terminal from Seymour Direct  they are provided with the suitable terminal for their business, which includes the most secure form of card processing machines, known as  "Chip and Pin" payments. The latter involves matching a customer pin code against a unique electronic chip on each customer’s debit card, magnetic stripe card swipe is available in case the former becomes faulty, allowing the merchant to continue with trading.

The companies head office is based in Hertfordshire, with additional offices in South Wales. The current CEO is Martin Roberts.

History

Seymour Direct was formed in 1987 by an independent retailer to negotiate lower rates for credit card processing, their aim was to relieve small to medium businesses of the high charges that were set by the high street banks. Although they offered their services to larger businesses, their main clients were B&B’s and Beauty Salons.

In 2013 Seymour Direct were the first merchant services providers to offer Contactless payment terminals  that small businesses could directly hire without the need to apply for brand name Visa payWave or MasterCard payPass.

Seymour Direct is now one of the UK’s leading independent sales organisations distributing credit and debit card processing services to small to medium businesses.

References

Payment service providers